The Hugo Award is an annual literary award for the best science fiction or fantasy works and achievements of the previous year, given at the World Science Fiction Convention and chosen by its members. The Hugo is widely considered the premier award in science fiction. The award is administered by the World Science Fiction Society. It is named after Hugo Gernsback, the founder of the pioneering science fiction magazine Amazing Stories. Hugos were first given in 1953, at the 11th World Science Fiction Convention, and have been awarded every year since 1955.

The awards were originally given in seven categories. These categories have changed over the years, and the award is currently conferred in seventeen categories of written and dramatic works. The winners receive a trophy consisting of a stylized rocket ship on a base; the design of the trophy changes each year, though the rocket itself has been standardized since 1984. The Hugo Awards are considered "the premier award in the science fiction genre", and winners are often noted on book covers.

The 2022 awards were presented at the 80th Worldcon, "Chicon 8", in Chicago on September 4, 2022. The 2023 awards will be presented at the 81st Worldcon, "Chengdu Worldcon", in Chengdu, China on August 19, 2023.

Award

The World Science Fiction Society (WSFS) gives out the Hugo Awards each year for the best science fiction or fantasy works and achievements of the previous year. The Hugos are widely considered the premier award in science fiction. The award is named after Hugo Gernsback, who founded the pioneering science fiction magazine Amazing Stories and who is considered one of the "fathers" of the science fiction genre. Works are eligible for an award if they were published in the prior calendar year, or translated into English in the prior calendar year. There are no written rules as to which works qualify as science fiction or fantasy, and the decision of eligibility in that regard is left up to the voters, rather than to the organizing committee. Hugo Award nominees and winners are chosen by supporting or attending members of the annual World Science Fiction Convention, or Worldcon, and the presentation evening constitutes its central event. The selection process is defined in the WSFS constitution as instant-runoff voting with six nominees per category, except in the case of a tie. The awards are split over more than a dozen categories, and include both written and dramatic works.

For each category of Hugo, the voter may rank "No Award" as one of their choices. Voters are instructed that they should do so if they feel that none of the nominees are worthy of the award, or if they feel the category should be abolished entirely. A vote for "No Award" other than as one's first choice signifies that the voter believes the nominees ranked higher than "No Award" are worthy of a Hugo in that category, while those ranked lower are not.

The six works on the ballot for each category are the most-nominated by members that year, with no limit on the number of stories that can be nominated. With the exception of 1956, the first years of the awards did not include any recognition of runner-up novels, but since 1959 all of the candidates have been recorded. Initial nominations are made by members in January through March, while voting on the ballot of six nominations is performed roughly in April through July, subject to change depending on when that year's Worldcon is held. Prior to 2017, the final ballot was five works in each category. Worldcons are generally held near the start of September, and take place in a different city around the world each year.

The idea of giving out awards at Worldcons was proposed by Harold Lynch for the 1953 convention. The idea was based on the Academy Awards, with the name "Hugo" being given by Robert A. Madle. The award trophy was created by Jack McKnight and Ben Jason in 1953, based on the design of hood ornaments of 1950s cars. It consisted of a finned rocket ship on a wooden base. Each subsequent trophy, with the exception of the 1958 trophy (a plaque), has been similar to the original design. The rocket trophy was formally redesigned in 1984, and since then only the base of the trophy has changed each year. There is no monetary or other remuneration associated with the Hugo, other than the trophy.

Retro-Hugos 
Retrospective Hugo Awards, or Retro-Hugos, were added as a concept to the Hugo Awards in 1996. They are awards given for years in which no Hugos were originally awarded. Prior to 2017, they could be awarded for works in a year 50, 75, or 100 years prior, after 1939, where there was a Worldcon but where no Hugos were awarded. Retro-Hugos are given by a Worldcon in the categories that are currently in use, and are optional; some Worldcons have chosen not to award them despite a year being eligible. Even for years in which Retro-Hugos are given, not all categories receive enough nominations to receive a ballot. In 2017, the eligible years were specified to be 1939–1952 and 1954, which expanded the possible years to include those post-1939 in which no Worldcon was held at all. Of the fifteen years eligible, awards have been given for eight.

History

1950s
The first Hugo Awards were presented at the 11th Worldcon in Philadelphia in 1953, which awarded Hugos in seven categories. The awards presented that year were initially conceived as a one-off event, though the organizers hoped that subsequent conventions would also present them. At the time, Worldcons were completely run by their respective committees as independent events and had no oversight between years. Thus there was no mandate for any future conventions to repeat the awards, and no set rules for how to do so.

The 1954 Worldcon chose not to, but the awards were reinstated at the 1955 Worldcon, and thereafter became traditional. The award was called the Annual Science Fiction Achievement Award, with "Hugo Award" being an unofficial, but better known name. The nickname was accepted as an official alternative name in 1958, and since the 1992 awards the nickname has been adopted as the official name of the award.

For the first few years, Hugo Awards had no published rules, and were given for works published in the "preceding year" leading up to the convention, which was not defined but generally covered the period between conventions rather than calendar years. In 1959, though there were still no formal guidelines governing the awards, several rules were instated which thereafter became traditional. These included having a ballot for nominating works earlier in the year and separate from the voting ballot; defining eligibility to include works published in the previous calendar year, rather than the ambiguous "preceding year"; and allowing voters to select "No Award" as an option if no nominated works were felt to be deserving of the award. "No Award" won that year in two categories: Dramatic Presentation and Best New Author. The eligibility change additionally sparked a separate rule, prohibiting the nomination of works which had been nominated for the 1958 awards, as the two time periods overlapped.

1960s
In 1961, after the formation of the WSFS to oversee each Worldcon committee, formal rules were set down in the WSFS constitution mandating the presenting of the awards as one of the responsibilities of each Worldcon organizing committee. The rules restricted voting to members of the convention at which the awards would be given, while still allowing anyone to nominate works; nominations were restricted to members of the convention or the previous year's convention in 1963. The guidelines also specified the categories that would be awarded, which could only be changed by the World Science Fiction Society board. These categories were for Best Novel, Short Fiction (short stories, broadly defined), Dramatic Presentation, Professional Magazine, Professional Artist, and Best Fanzine. 1963 was also the second year in which "No Award" won a category, again for Dramatic Presentation.

In 1964 the guidelines were changed to allow individual conventions to create additional categories, which was codified as up to two categories for that year. These additional awards were officially designated as Hugo Awards, but were not required to be repeated by future conventions. This was later adjusted to only allow one additional category; while these special Hugo Awards have been given out in several categories, only a few were ever awarded for more than one year.

In 1967 categories for Novelette, Fan Writer, and Fan Artist were added, and a category for Best Novella was added the following year; these new categories had the effect of providing a definition for what word count qualified a work for what category, which was previously left up to voters. Novelettes had also been awarded prior to the codification of the rules. The fan awards were initially conceived as separate from the Hugo Awards, with the award for Best Fanzine losing its status, but were instead absorbed into the regular Hugo Awards by the convention committee.

1970s
While traditionally five works had been selected for nomination in each category out of the proposed nominees, in 1971 this was set down as a formal rule, barring ties. In 1973, the WSFS removed the category for Best Professional Magazine, and a Best Professional Editor award was instated as its replacement, in order to recognize "the increasing importance of original anthologies".

After that year the guidelines were changed again to remove the mandated awards and instead allow up to ten categories which would be chosen by each convention, though they were expected to be similar to those presented in the year before. Despite this change no new awards were added or previous awards removed before the guidelines were changed back to listing specific categories in 1977. 1971 and 1977 both saw "No Award" win the Dramatic Presentation category for the third and fourth time; "No Award" did not win any categories afterwards until 2015.

1980s and 1990s
In 1980 the category for Best Non-Fiction Book (later renamed Best Related Work) was added, followed by a category for Best Semiprozine (semi-professional magazine) in 1984. In 1983, members of the Church of Scientology were encouraged by people such as Charles Platt to nominate as a bloc Battlefield Earth, written by the organization's founder L. Ron Hubbard, for the Best Novel award; it did not make the final ballot. Another campaign followed in 1987 to nominate Hubbard's Black Genesis; it made the final ballot but finished behind "No Award". 1989 saw a work—The Guardsman by Todd Hamilton and P. J. Beese—withdrawn by its authors from the final ballot after a fan bought numerous memberships under false names, all sent in on the same day, in order to get the work onto the ballot.

In 1990 the Best Original Art Work award was given as a special Hugo Award, and was listed again in 1991, though not actually awarded, and established afterward as an official Hugo Award. It was then removed from this status in 1996, and has not been awarded since. The Retro Hugos were created in the mid-1990s, and were first awarded in 1996.

Since 2000
Another special Hugo Award, for Best Web Site, was given twice in 2002 and 2005, but never instated as a permanent category. In 2003, the Dramatic Presentation award was split into two categories, Long Form and Short Form. This was repeated with the Best Professional Editor category in 2007. 2009 saw the addition of the Best Graphic Story category, and in 2012 an award for Best Fancast was added.

In 2015, two groups of science fiction writers, the "Sad Puppies" led by Brad R. Torgersen and Larry Correia, and the "Rabid Puppies" led by Vox Day, each put forward a similar slate of suggested nominations which came to dominate the ballot. The Sad Puppies campaign had run for two years prior on a smaller scale, with limited success. The leaders of the campaigns characterized them as a reaction to "niche, academic, overtly [leftist]" nominees and the Hugo becoming "an affirmative action award" that preferred female and non-white authors and characters. In response, five nominees declined their nomination before and, for the first time, two after the ballot was published. Multiple-Hugo-winner Connie Willis declined to present the awards. The slates were characterized by The Guardian as a "right wing", "orchestrated backlash" and by The A.V. Club as a "group of white guys", and were linked with the Gamergate controversy. Multiple Hugo winner Samuel R. Delany characterized the campaigns as a response to "socio-economic" changes such as minority authors gaining prominence and thus "economic heft". In all but the Best Dramatic Presentation, Long Form category, "No Award" placed above all nominees that were on either slate, and it won all five categories that only contained slate nominees. The two campaigns were repeated in 2016 with some changes, and the "Rabid Puppy" slate again dominated the ballot in several categories, with all five nominees in Best Related Work, Best Graphic Story, Best Professional Artist, and Best Fancast.

In response to the campaigns, a set of new rules, called "E Pluribus Hugo", were passed in 2015 and ratified in 2016 to modify the nominations process. Intended to ensure that organized minority groups cannot dominate every finalist position in a category, the new rules define a voting system in which nominees are eliminated one by one, with each vote for an eliminated work then spread out over the uneliminated works they nominated, until only the final shortlist remains. These rules were ratified in 2016 to be used for the first time in 2017. A rule mandating that the final nominees must appear on at least five percent of ballots was also eliminated, to ensure that all categories could reach a full set of nominees even when the initial pool of works was very large. Each nominator is limited to five works in each category, but the final ballot was changed to six in each; additionally, no more than two works by a given author or group, or in the same dramatic series, can be in one category on the final ballot.

In 2018 the newest permanent category, Best Series, was begun; it was run the year prior as a special Hugo Award prior to being ratified at the business meeting. Another special Hugo Award, for Best Art Book, was run in 2019 but not repeated or made a permanent category. The 2021 Hugo Awards featured a special Hugo award for video games. The Hugo Study Committee is evaluating a proposal for a "Best Game or Interactive Experience" category, which they or others may propose to the 2022 convention.

Categories

Worldcon committees may also give out special awards during the Hugo ceremony, which are not voted on. Unlike the additional Hugo categories which Worldcons may present, these awards are not officially Hugo Awards and do not use the same trophy, though they once did. Two additional awards, the Astounding Award for Best New Writer and the Lodestar Award for Best Young Adult Book, are presented at the Hugo Award ceremony and voted on by the same process, but are not formally Hugo Awards.

Recognition
The Hugo Award is highly regarded by observers. The Los Angeles Times has termed it "among the highest honors bestowed in science fiction and fantasy writing", a claim echoed by Wired, who said that it was "the premier award in the science fiction genre". Justine Larbalestier, in The Battle of the Sexes in Science Fiction (2002), referred to the awards as "the best known and most prestigious of the science fiction awards", and Jo Walton, writing in An Informal History of the Hugos, said it was "undoubtedly science fiction's premier award". The Guardian similarly acknowledged it as "a fine showcase for speculative fiction" as well as "one of the most venerable, democratic and international" science fiction awards "in existence". James Gunn, in The New Encyclopedia of Science Fiction (1988), echoed The Guardians statement of the award's democratic nature, saying that "because of its broad electorate" the Hugos were the awards most representative of "reader popularity". Camille Bacon-Smith, in Science Fiction Culture (2000), said that at the time fewer than 1000 people voted on the final ballot; she held, however, that this is a representative sample of the readership at large, given the number of winning novels that remain in print for decades or become notable outside of the science fiction genre, such as The Demolished Man or The Left Hand of Darkness. The 2014 awards saw over 1900 nomination submissions and over 3500 voters on the final ballot, while the 1964 awards received 274 votes. The 2019 awards saw 1800 nominating ballots and 3097 votes, which was described as less than in 2014–2017 but more than any year before then.

Brian Aldiss, in his book Trillion Year Spree: The History of Science Fiction, claimed that the Hugo Award was a barometer of reader popularity, rather than artistic merit; he contrasted it with the panel-selected Nebula Award, which provided "more literary judgment", though he did note that the winners of the two awards often overlapped. Along with the Hugo Award, the Nebula Award is also considered one of the premier awards in science fiction, with Laura Miller of Salon.com terming it "science fiction's most prestigious award".

The official logo of the Hugo Awards is often placed on the winning books' cover as a promotional tool. Gahan Wilson, in First World Fantasy Awards (1977), claimed that noting that a book had won the Hugo Award on the cover "demonstrably" increased sales for that novel, though Orson Scott Card said in his 1990 book How to Write Science Fiction & Fantasy that the award had a larger effect on foreign sales than in the United States. Spider Robinson, in 1992, claimed that publishers were very interested in authors that won a Hugo Award, more so than for other awards such as the Nebula Award. Literary agent Richard Curtis said in his 1996 Mastering the Business of Writing that having the term Hugo Award on the cover, even as a nominee, was a "powerful inducement" to science fiction fans to buy a novel, while Jo Walton claimed in 2011 that the Hugo is the only science fiction award "that actually affects sales of a book".

There have been several anthologies of Hugo-winning short fiction. The series The Hugo Winners, edited by Isaac Asimov, was started in 1962 as a collection of short story winners up to the previous year, and concluded with the 1982 Hugos in Volume 5. The New Hugo Winners, edited originally by Asimov, later by Connie Willis and finally by Gregory Benford, has four volumes collecting stories from the 1983 to the 1994 Hugos. The most recent anthology is The Hugo Award Showcase (2010), edited by Mary Robinette Kowal. It contains most of the short stories, novelettes, and novellas that were nominated for the 2009 award.

See also
 List of science fiction awards
 List of joint winners of the Hugo and Nebula awards
 Nebula Award
 BSFA Award
 Locus Award

References

Citations

Sources

External links

 
 Current rules (including Constitution) of the WSFS

 
1953 establishments in the United States
Awards established in 1953
Fantasy awards
Science fiction awards